A general public survey on corruption from Transparency International shows that citizens perceive Bosnia and Herzegovina's political structures to be deeply affected by corruption. Two-thirds of citizens believe that the government's efforts to combat corruption are ineffective.

On Transparency International's 2021 Corruption Perceptions Index, Bosnia and Herzegovina scored 35 on a scale from 0 ("highly corrupt") to 100 ("very clean"). When ranked by score, Bosnia and Herzegovina ranked 110th among the 180 countries in the Index, where the country ranked first is perceived to have the most honest public sector.  For comparison, the best score was 88 (ranked 1), and the worst score was 11 (ranked 180).

Dynamics 
Corruption levels are considered high in Bosnia and Herzegovina and have created stumbling blocks in its bid for future EU membership, according to the EU's Progress Report in 2013. The country's complex legal and regulatory frameworks create opportunities for corruption. Facilitation payments are seen as pervasive throughout the Bosnian business climate.

Anti-corruption efforts 
The government has set up the 2009-2014 Strategy for the Fight against Corruption and prosecuted several high-profile cases, yet the overall enforcement of the legislative and institutional frameworks remains poor.

Enhancing Civil Society Participation 

Citizens participation and the values of integrity, accountability, and transparency are crucial components of fighting corruption.  It is important to develop programs and actions to change the cultural understanding of corruption and help citizens to act against abuses.

References

External links 
 Bosnia and Herzegovina Corruption Profile from the Business Anti-Corruption Portal

Society of Bosnia and Herzegovina
Politics of Bosnia and Herzegovina
Crime in Bosnia and Herzegovina by type
Bosnia